The Douglas DC-7 is an American transport aircraft built by the Douglas Aircraft Company from 1953 to 1958. A derivative of the DC-6, it was the last major piston engine-powered transport made by Douglas, being developed shortly after the earliest jet airliner—the de Havilland Comet—entered service and only a few years before the jet-powered Douglas DC-8 first flew in 1958. Unlike other aircraft in Douglas's line of propeller-driven aircraft, no examples remain in service in the present day, as compared to the far more successful DC-3 and DC-6.

Design and development
In 1945 Pan American World Airways requested a DC-7, a civil version of the Douglas C-74 Globemaster military transport. Pan Am soon canceled their order. That proposed DC-7 was unrelated to the later DC-6-derived airliner.

American Airlines revived the designation when they requested an aircraft that could fly the USA coast-to-coast non-stop in about eight hours. (Civil Air Regulations then limited domestic flight crews to 8 hours' flight time in any 24-hour period.) Douglas was reluctant to build the aircraft until American Airlines president C. R. Smith ordered 25 at a total price of $40 million, thus covering Douglas' development costs.

The DC-7 wing was based on that of the DC-4 and DC-6, with the same span; the fuselage was  longer than the DC-6B. Four eighteen-cylinder Wright R-3350 Duplex-Cyclone Turbo-Compound engines provided power. The prototype flew in May 1953 and American received their first DC-7 in November, inaugurating the first non-stop east-coast-to-west-coast service in the country (unrealistically scheduled just under the eight-hour limit for one crew) and forcing rival TWA to offer a similar service with its Super Constellations. Both aircraft frequently experienced inflight engine failures, causing many flights to be diverted. Some blamed this on the need for high-power settings to meet the notional schedules, causing overheating and failure of the engines' power recovery turbines.

The DC-7 was followed by the DC-7B with slightly more power, and on some DC-7Bs (Pan Am and South African Airways), fuel tanks over the wing in the rear of the engine nacelles, each carrying . South African Airways used this variant to fly Johannesburg to London with one stop. Pan Am's DC-7Bs started flying transatlantic in summer 1955, scheduled 1 hr 45 min faster than the Super Stratocruiser from New York to London or Paris.

Operational history
Early DC-7s were purchased only by U.S. carriers. European carriers could not take advantage of the small range-increase of the early DC-7, so Douglas released an extended-range variant, the DC-7C (Seven Seas) in 1956. Two  wingroot inserts added fuel capacity, reduced interference drag and made the cabin quieter by moving the engines farther outboard; all DC-7Cs had the nacelle fuel tanks previously seen on Pan American's and South African's DC-7Bs.

Since the late 1940s Pan Am and other airlines had scheduled a few non-stop flights from New York to Europe, but westward non-stops against the prevailing wind were rarely possible with an economic payload. The L1049G and DC-7B that appeared in 1955 could occasionally make the westward trip, but in summer 1956 Pan Am's DC-7C finally started doing it fairly reliably. BOAC was forced to respond by purchasing DC-7Cs rather than wait on the delivery of the Bristol Britannia. The DC-7C found its way into several other overseas airlines' fleets, including SAS, which used them on cross-polar flights to North America and Asia. The DC-7C sold better than its rival, the Lockheed L-1649A Starliner, which entered service a year later, but sales were cut short by the arrival of Boeing 707 and Douglas DC-8 jets in 1958–60.

Starting in 1959 Douglas began converting DC-7s and DC-7Cs into DC-7F freighters to extend their useful lives. The airframes were fitted with large forward and rear freight doors and some cabin windows were removed.

The predecessor DC-6, especially the DC-6B, established a reputation for straightforward engineering and reliability. Pratt & Whitney, manufacturer of the DC-6s Double Wasp engines, did not offer an effective larger engine apart from the Wasp Major, which had a reputation for poor reliability. Douglas turned to Wright Aeronautical for a more powerful engine. The Duplex-Cyclone had reliability issues of its own, and this affected the DC-7's service record. Carriers who had both DC-6s and DC-7s in their fleets usually replaced the newer DC-7s first once jets started to arrive. Some airlines retired their DC-7s after little more than five years of service, whereas most DC-6s lasted longer and sold more readily on the secondhand market.

Basic price of a new DC-7 was around $823,308 (£570,000).

Price of a DC-7B was around $982,226 (£680,000) in 1955, rising to $1,184,490 (£820,000) in 1957.

Similarly, the price of a DC-7C was $1,155,560 (£800,000) in 1956, increasing to $1,343,385 (£930,000) by 1958.

Cost of the DC-7F "Speedfreighter" conversion was around $166,112 (£115,000) per aircraft.

Variants
DC-7
Production variant, 105 built.
DC-7B
First long-range variant with higher gross weight and fuel capacity, with most of the added fuel in saddle tanks in enlarged engine nacelles. (Only Pan Am and South African DC-7Bs had the saddle tanks.) 112 built.
DC-7C Seven Seas
Longer-range variant with non-stop transatlantic capability, improved  R-3350 engines and increased fuel capacity mainly in longer wings, 121 built.
DC-7D
Unbuilt variant with Rolls-Royce Tyne turboprops.
DC-7F
Freight conversion of all three variants with two large freight doors.

Operators

Airlines
DC-7s were used by Alitalia, American Airlines, BOAC, Braniff Airways, Caledonian Airways, Delta Air Lines, Eastern Air Lines, Flying Tigers, Japan Airlines, KLM, Mexicana de Aviacion, National Airlines, Northwest Orient, Panair do Brasil, Pan American World Airways, Riddle Airlines, Sabena, SAS, South African Airways, Swissair, Turkish Airlines, Transports Aériens Intercontinentaux, and United Airlines.

Seventeen DC-7s remained on the U.S. registry in 2010, they were used mainly for cargo and as aerial firefighting airtankers. Due to its engine problems, the DC-7 has not had the same longevity as the DC-6, which is still used by a number of commercial operators.

Military operators
 
 
 
  Flown by civilian sanctions buster Jack Malloch

Orders and production

Accidents and incidents
The Douglas DC-7 suffered 82 incidents and accidents with a total of 714 fatalities.

June 30, 1956 United Airlines Flight 718, a DC-7, (N6324C) collided over the Grand Canyon with TWA Flight 2, an L-1049 Super Constellation (N6902C), resulting in the deaths of 128 people on both aircraft.

January 31, 1957 A DC-7 (N8210H) still owned by Douglas crashed into a school yard in the Pacoima area of Los Angeles, California, following a midair collision with Northrop F-89J Scorpion 52-1870, resulting in the deaths of the four crewmembers aboard the DC-7, the pilot of the Scorpion jet, and three students on the ground.

March 5, 1957 An American Air Lines DC-7B (N316AA) on a flight from Idlewild (JFK) airport to Love Field (Dallas) suffered failure of the #1 engine.  The propeller and nose section detached and struck the fuselage, leading to decompression.  The pilot made a successful emergency landing at Memphis; there were no fatalities or injuries. The plane was repaired and returned to service.

June 28, 1957 An Eastern Air Lines DC-7B (N808D) collided with a parked Eastern Air Lines Lockheed L-1049 (N6212C) at Miami International Airport after returning from a training flight. Fuel leaked and both aircraft burned out.

February 1, 1958 Pan Am Flight 70, a DC-7C (N733PA, Clipper Blue Jacket), landed wheels-up at Schiphol Airport as a result of pilot error; all 16 on board survived. The aircraft was repaired and returned to service as a freighter.  See also July 26 1970 below.

March 10, 1958 A DC-7B (N846D) still owned by Douglas crashed at Long Beach, California during a test flight before delivery to Eastern Air Lines.

March 25, 1958 Braniff Flight 971, a DC-7C (N5904), crashed shortly after takeoff from Miami while attempting to return after an engine caught fire. Nine passengers out of 24 people aboard died in the accident.

April 21, 1958 United Airlines Flight 736, a DC-7 (N6328C) en route from Los Angeles to Denver, collided with a Nellis Air Force Base, North American F-100 Super Sabre "F-100F" (two-seater) (56-3755) near Las Vegas. Both aircraft crashed out of control resulting in the deaths of 49 people.

May 18, 1958 A Sabena DC-7C (OO-SFA) crashed near Casablanca–Anfa Airport during the attempted landing. All nine crewmembers and 52 of the 56 passengers died.

September 24, 1959 TAI Flight 307, a DC-7C, crashed at Bordeaux airport with the loss of 54 lives. After takeoff, the aircraft failed to gain altitude and collided with trees  from the start of the takeoff.

November 16, 1959 National Airlines Flight 967, a DC-7B on a flight from Tampa, Florida, to New Orleans, crashed into the Gulf of Mexico. All 42 occupants perished. Although sabotage was suspected, no definite cause of the crash was determined due to a lack of evidence. The aircraft was owned by Delta Air Lines.

February 26, 1960 Alitalia Flight 618, a DC-7C (I-DUVO), crashed at Shannon Airport, Ireland, shortly after takeoff following a loss of altitude while making a left turn with 34 fatalities out of 52 passengers and crew. No cause was established for this accident.

July 14, 1960 Northwest Orient Airlines Flight 1-11, a DC-7C (N292), ditched off Polillo Island, Philippines due to failure of the number two engine and fire; one person (out of 58 on board) died when the number two propeller separated and penetrated the fuselage.

February 18, 1961 A Pan AM DC-7CF (N745PA) struck a mound of earth short of the runway in Stuttgart while attempting an ILS approach, shearing off the undercarriage and #1 engine. The pilots retained control and were able to climb away, then make a belly landing at Nurnberg airport.  The aircraft was written off.

November 1, 1961 A Panair do Brasil DC-7C (PP-PDO) flying from Sal to Recife crashed into a hill about  short of the runway at Recife. Forty-five passengers and crew out of the 88 persons aboard lost their lives. The accident was attributed to pilot error.

March 4, 1962 Caledonian Airways Flight 153 crashed into a swamp shortly after takeoff from Douala International Airport; all 111 people on board died. It is the worst single-aircraft accident of a DC-7.

October 22, 1962 Northwest Airlines Flight 292, a DC-7C (N285) with 7 crew and 95 passengers, made a successful water landing in Sitka Sound just before 1 p.m. local time after struggling with propeller problems for 45 minutes while operating as a military charter flight between McChord Air Force Base and Elmendorf Air Force Base. The plane stayed afloat for 24 minutes after coming to rest in the water, giving the occupants ample time to evacuate into life rafts with only 6 minor injuries reported. All passengers and crew were quickly rescued by U.S. Coast Guard ships. The cause was an overspeeding propeller when the blower section on engine number two failed.

November 30, 1962 Eastern Air Lines Flight 512, a DC-7B on a flight from Charlotte, North Carolina, to New York-Idlewild, crashed after a missed approach due to fog. This accident, which cost 25 lives (out of 51 on board), was attributed to improper crew procedures.

June 3, 1963 Northwest Airlines Flight 293, a Military Air Transport Service flight from McChord Air Force Base in Washington state to Elmendorf Air Force Base in Alaska crashed into the Pacific Ocean near Annette Island, Alaska, with the loss of all 101 people aboard. Due to the lack of evidence, no cause was established for this accident.

February 8, 1965 Eastern Air Lines Flight 663 crashed a few minutes after takeoff from John F. Kennedy Airport in New York after taking evasive action to avoid a possible collision with another airliner (Pan Am Flight 212, a Boeing 707). All 84 passengers and crew died.

December 7, 1968 A North American Aircraft Trading DC-7C (VR-BCY) crashed during approach to Uli Airstrip following triple engine failure during a relief flight, killing all four crew.

June 5, 1969 A Swedish Red Cross DC-7B (SE-ERP) was shot down by a Nigerian Air Force MiG-17 and crashed at Eket, Nigeria, killing all four crew. The aircraft was operating a supply flight from Fernando Po (now Bioko) to Biafra.

July 26, 1970 An ARCO ferry flight of a DC-7CF (VR-BCT), from Kinshasha suffered an explosive failure of the #3 engine.  The pilots succeeded in making a belly landing on 2 engines (engine #4 having been inoperable for the entire flight), however the plane was damaged beyond repair. This aircraft had previously crashed in 1958.

October 2, 1970 A Spantax DC-7C (EC-ATQ) was written off at Barajas Airport.

December 31, 1972 Professional Baseball player Roberto Clemente and 4 others in a chartered DC-7 died when the plane crashed shortly after takeoff from San Juan, Puerto Rico. Only parts of the fuselage and the body of pilot Jerry Hill were recovered. The cause was traced to maintenance and pilot errors.

June 21, 1973 A Skyways International DC-7C (N296) crashed in the Everglades six minutes after takeoff from Miami International Airport, apparently caused by an onboard fire and/or severe turbulence. Three crew members, the sole occupants, died. The aircraft was on lease to Warnaco Incorporated.

March 3, 1974 A Douglas DC-7C/F (EI-AWG) operating an Aer Turas Teo charter flight from Dublin landed at Luton Airport on runway 08 just after midnight but failed to achieve reverse thrust. Normal braking application also was ineffective and the emergency pneumatic brakes were applied. All main wheel tires burst. The aircraft overran the runway and continued over the steep bank at the eastern perimeter finally coming to rest in soft ground 90 metres beyond. The situation had also been made worse by an inadvertent application of forward thrust by the crew in trying to achieve reverse thrust. Three of the six passengers and two of the four crew were injured. The badly damaged aircraft was written off.

October 4, 1976 An Emirates Air Transport DC-7CF (TZ-ARC) struck Mount Kenya due to a premature descent, killing the four crew.

September 12, 1977 A Safe Air Cargo DC-7BF (N6314J) crashed on climbout from Yakutat Airport after an engine lost power and caught fire, killing the four crew. 14 CFR 91 subpart D was revised in the wake of this accident.

September 6, 1978 An Advance Aviation Inc. DC-7CF (N244B) was being used to smuggle marijuana when it crashed near Farmerville, Louisiana due to pilot error, killing one of six on board. Thirty-five bales of marijuana were recovered from the wreckage.

June 22, 1979 A Go Transportation DC-7CF (N357AL) crashed on climbout from Barstow Airport due to overloading and loss of engine power (caused by improper 100 octane fuel), killing one of six crew.

September 14, 1979 A Butler Aircraft Inc. DC-7 (N4SW) transporting company employees to Medford, Oregon, crashed on the crest of Surveyor Mountain near Klamath Falls, Oregon. The crash, which claimed the 12 occupants aboard, was attributed to the crew's decision to undertake a night flight at low altitude.

1980 An Aero Services Corp. DC-7CF (N8219H) was shot down and crashed in Colombia during a smuggling flight.

July 27, 1980 A Lambda Air Cargo DC-7CF (CP-1291) burned out on the ground at Trujillo Airport.

November 28, 1980 A Central Air Service DC-7B (N816D) crashed near Pecos Municipal Airport, Texas, soon after takeoff killing the pilot and co-pilot onboard. The plane entered a steep 90° left bank after takeoff, descended fast with the no. 2 prop feathered and crashed in a field.

October 9, 1986 A T&G Aviation DC-7C (N5903) ditched off Dakar due to engine problems, killing three of four crew.

December 8, 1988 A T&G Aviation DC-7CF (N284) was shot down by a SAM-7 missile fired by the Polisario Front and crashed in the Western Sahara, killing the five crew. A second T&G DC-7 (N90984) was also hit, losing an engine, but was able to land safely. Polisario soldiers thought the aircraft were Moroccan C-130s.

October 1, 1992 A TBM Incorporated DC-7B (N848D) crashed near Union Valley Reservoir, California due to pilot error and poor crew resource management, killing both pilots.

Surviving aircraft
No DC-7s are in operation today. A small number survive on display:
 N381AA is on display at Epic Flight Academy in New Smyrna Beach, Florida.
 N4887C is on display at the Delta Flight Museum in Atlanta, Georgia.
 A DC-7 tail number C-0921 (nicknamed "Charlie 21"), originally flown by United Airlines, was installed at Iliff Preschool in Denver, Colorado in 1971 and is still serving as a kindergarten classroom.
 EC-BBT is on display in Gran Canaria.
 N51701 is on display at the Pima Air and Space Museum in Tucson, Arizona.
 Three Erickson Aero Tanker DC-7s are currently parked at Madras Municipal Airport, Madras, Oregon. N838D (Tanker 60) is planned to join the Erickson Aircraft Collection; N401US (Tanker 62) and N6353C (Tanker 66) are withdrawn from use, awaiting disposal.

Specifications (DC-7C)

See also

References

Notes

Bibliography
 Germano da Silva, Carlos Ari César. "Buraco negro." O rastro da bruxa: história da aviação comercial brasileira no século XX através dos seus acidentes 1928–1996 (in Portuguese). Porto Alegre: Edipucrs, Second edition, 2008. .
 Pearcy, Arthur. Douglas Propliners: DC-1–DC-7. Shrewsbury, UK: Airlife Publishing, 1995. .
 Slade, Ken. Last of the Big Props: Personal Tribute to BOAC's Douglas DC-7Cs. Air Enthusiast 105, May/June 2003, pp. 28–31. 
 United States Air Force Museum Guidebook. Wright-Patterson AFB, Ohio; Air Force Museum Foundation, 1975.
 Whittle, John A. The Douglas DC-6 and DC-7 Series. Tonbridge, Kent, UK: Air Britain (Historians) Ltd., 1971. No ISBN.
 Wilson, Stewart. Airliners of the World. Fyshwick, ACT, Australia: Aerospace Publications Pty, 1999. 
 Yenne, Bill. McDonnell Douglas: A Tale of Two Giants. Greenwich, Connecticut: Bison Books, 1985. .

External links

 Boeing McDonnell Douglas page on DC-7
 Airliners.net on the DC-7
 Smithsonian National Air and Space Museum page on the DC-7 – features panorama views of cockpit and forward cabin

1950s United States airliners
DC-07
Low-wing aircraft
Four-engined tractor aircraft
Aircraft first flown in 1953
Four-engined piston aircraft